The Balancing Rocks are geomorphological features of igneous rocks found in many parts of Zimbabwe, and are particularly noteworthy in Matopos National Park, and near the township of Epworth, to the southeast of Harare.

Notable rocks 

 The Domboremari, also known as the Money Rock, is a formation of three boulders that form part of the Chiremba Balancing Rocks on the northwestern outskirts of Epworth: this particular rock formation is notable because it appears in all Zimbabwean banknotes issued since 1981, and is also the prominent feature of the logo of the Reserve Bank of Zimbabwe.

References

Harare
Landforms of Zimbabwe
Rock formations of Africa
Geography of Harare Province